Raúl Nava López (born 17 September 1990 in Mexico, D. F., Mexico) is a Mexican footballer who currently plays for Tejaro F.C. in Chicago

Club career

Toluca F.C.
He made his professional debut with Club Toluca in the Apertura 2008 season uprising from the Atlético Mexiquense squad. He scored his first goal in the quarterfinals home game against Tecos UAG. He scored his second goal with Toluca in a match against C.D. Guadalajara. He was awarded best young player of the Apertura 2009 tournament.

U-23 International appearances
As of 22 February 2012

Honours
Tijuana
 Liga MX: Apertura 2012

Individual
 Primera División de México Rookie of the Tournament: Apertura 2009
 CONCACAF Champions League Golden Boot: 2013–14

References

External links

1990 births
Living people
Liga MX players
Association football midfielders
Deportivo Toluca F.C. players
Atlético Mexiquense footballers
Footballers from Mexico City
Mexican footballers